= Natia Sartania =

Georgian pianist and electronic musician

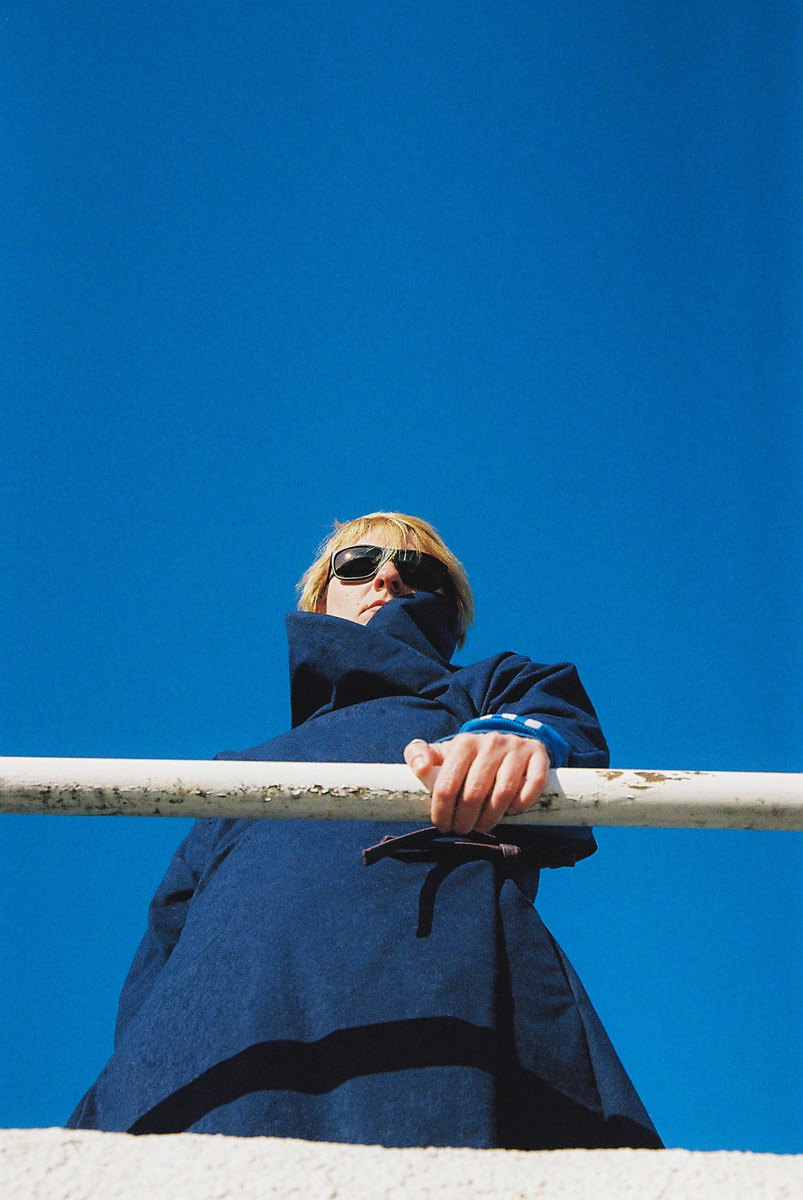

Natia Sartania, known professionally as sTia, is a Georgian pianist, electronic musician, artist, and educator. She is the founder of Creative Education Studio (CES), a creative media education organization based in Tbilisi, Georgia, and CES Records, an independent record label.

== Career ==
Natia Sartania began studying piano in early childhood and performed with the Tbilisi Philharmonic Orchestra at the age of seven. In 1995, she moved to London, where she continued her musical studies and participated in piano competitions. Natia later became involved in electronic music. Billboard Georgia describes her as one of the first female DJs associated with the development of Georgia's drum and bass scene. During the late 1990s and early 2000s, she hosted radio programmes in Tbilisi and began producing electronic music.

In 2011, Sartania founded Creative Education Studio (CES), an educational organization focused on music, sound, design, and digital media. In 2018, she founded CES Records, an independent record label

As sTia, she has released music combining electronic and piano-based compositions. Her releases include the EP Home (2023) and the single Run Run (2019)

== Other activities ==
She is a co-founder of the GMLC (Georgian Music Legacy Collection), a record label and archival music project focused on preserving, reissuing, and promoting recordings from Georgia's early independent music scene,.
